von Hoff or Von Hoff is a surname. Notable people with the surname include:

Bruce Von Hoff (1943–2012), American baseball player
Karl Ernst Adolf von Hoff (1771–1837), German natural historian and geologist
Steele Von Hoff (born 1987), Australian road racing cyclist

See also
 Hoff (surname)
 van 't Hof